The Argentine general election of 1989 was held on 14 May 1989. Voters chose both the President and their legislators and with a turnout of 85.3%, Carlos Menem won the presidency, and the peronist Justicialist Party won the control of both houses of Congress. This is the last presidential election the president was elected by the electoral college.

Background 
Inheriting a difficult legacy from his military predecessors, President Raúl Alfonsín's tenure had been practically defined by the foreign debt Argentina's last dictatorship left behind. Signs of unraveling in Alfonsín's 1985 Austral Plan for economic stabilization cost his centrist Radical Civic Union (UCR) its majorities in the Chamber of Deputies (lower house of Congress) and among the nation's 22 governorships in the September 1987 mid-term elections.  Facing a restive armed forces opposed to trials against past human rights abuses and mounting inflation, the president brought elections forward five months, now scheduled for May 14, 1989. Both major parties held national conventions in May 1988. The UCR nominated Córdoba Governor Eduardo Angeloz, a safe, centrist choice and the most prominent UCR figure not closely tied to the unpopular President Alfonsín. In an upset, however, Carlos Menem, governor of the remote and thinly populated La Rioja Province, wrested the Justicialist Party nomination from the odds-on candidate, Buenos Aires Province Governor Antonio Cafiero, a policy maker close to the Justicialists' founder, the late Juan Perón. Cafiero's defeat resulted largely from CGT trade union opposition to his Peronist Renewal faction; Alfonsín's top political adviser, Interior Minister Enrique Nosiglia, in turn saw Menem's flamboyance as an opportunity for the struggling UCR.

The Justicialists (Peronists) took a sizable lead in polling early on, however, even as nearly half the voters remained undecided. Hoping to translate this into a UCR victory over the outspoken and eccentric Menem, President Alfonsín enacted an August 1988 "Springtime Plan" in a bid for lower inflation (then running at 27% monthly). The plan, criticized as a rehashed "Austral Plan" by the CGT, called for budget cuts and renewed wage freezes - policies they blamed for sliding living standards.  Initially successful, a record drought late in the year buffeted critical export earnings and led to rolling blackouts, dissipating any gains Angeloz might have made from the "relief" of 6% monthly inflation.

A perennial third-party candidate, conservative economist Álvaro Alsogaray, made gains following the January 1989 assault by Trotskyite militants on the La Tablada Barracks, west of Buenos Aires.  Twice minister of the economy and remembered for his belief that the economy must go through "winter," the unpopular Alsogaray ran on a free market platform, calling for mass privatizations and deep cuts in social spending (amid 30% poverty). Angeloz took the controversial decision of including social spending cuts in the UCR platform, as well, earning the right-wing Federal Party's endorsement; but alienating many others (particularly pensioners, among whom Alfonsín had won decisively in 1983). The largely civil campaign became increasingly a debate between the Justicialist nominee and the president, himself; Angeloz, the UCR nominee, remained "presidential" during the frequent exchanges of innuendo between Alfonsín and Menem.

Following a sharp drop in Central Bank reserves, the austral fell around 29% to the U.S. dollar in heavy trading on "black Tuesday," February 7.  The sudden drop in the austral's value threatened the nation's tenuous financial stability and, later that month, the World Bank recalled a large tranche of a loan package agreed on in 1988, sending the austral into a tailspin: trading at 17 to the dollar in January, the dollar quoted at over 100 australes by election day, May 14. Inflation, which had been held to the 5-10% monthly range as late as February, rose to 78.5% in May, shattering records and leading to a landslide victory for the Peronists. Polling revealed that economic anxieties were paramount among two-thirds of voters and Menem won in 19 of 22 provinces, while losing in the traditionally anti-Peronist Federal District (Buenos Aires).

The nation's finances did not stabilize after the election, as hoped. The austral halved to the dollar next week, alone, and on May 29, riots broke out in the poorer outskirts of a number of cities. Having declared his intention to stay on until inaugural day, December 10, these events and spiraling financial chaos led Alfonsín to transfer power to President-elect Menem five months early, on July 8. When Menem accepted the presidential sash from Alfonsín, it marked the first time since 1916 that an incumbent government peacefully transferred power to the opposition.

Candidates for presidency 
 Justicialist Party (Peronist, populist): Governor Carlos Menem of La Rioja Province
 Radical Civic Union (Center-left, social liberal): Governor Eduardo Angeloz of Córdoba Province
 Union of the Democratic Centre (Center-right, conservative liberal): Deputy Alvaro Alsogaray of the City of Buenos Aires

Results

President

Chamber of Deputies

Results by province

Notes 

1989
1989 elections in Argentina
Presidency of Carlos Menem
1989